Olaf Ludwig (born 13 April 1960 in Gera, Bezirk Gera) is a former German racing cyclist. His career began at the SG Dynamo Gera / Sportvereinigung (SV) Dynamo. As an East German, he raced as an amateur until reunification of Germany allowed him to become professional with Panasonic team. As a sprinter, the highlight of his career was winning the points classification in the 1990 Tour de France. Other highlights include the Olympic road race in Seoul in 1988, a record 38 stage victories in the Peace Race, winning the Amstel Gold Race in 1992, and podium placings in the Paris–Roubaix. He also won the 1992 UCI Road World Cup. In 1992 he won the Champs-Élysées stage in the Tour de France and won the third Tour stage of his career the following year.

His sprinting rivals included Mario Cipollini, Wilfried Nelissen and Djamolidine Abdoujaparov.

In 1993 he joined Team Telekom, later T-Mobile Team. On retirement in 1996 he took up public relations for the team. He subsequently became principal team manager, but his involvement with the team finished at the end of 2006.

Major results

1978
 1st  Team time trial, UCI Junior Road World Championships
1981
 1st  Overall Niedersachsen-Rundfahrt
1982
 1st  Overall Peace Race
1983
 1st  Overall Tour de l'Avenir
1986
 1st  Overall Peace Race
1988
 1st  Road race, Olympic Games
1990
 Tour de France
1st  Points classification
1st Stage 8
 Tour de Trump
1st  Points classification
1st, Stage 1, 2 & 9
1991
 1st E3 Prijs Vlaanderen
 9th UCI Road World Rankings
1992
 1st  Overall Four Days of Dunkirk
 1st  UCI Road World Cup
 1st Kuurne–Brussels–Kuurne
 1st Amstel Gold Race
 1st Dwars door Vlaanderen
 1st Grand Prix de Fourmies
 1st Stage 21 Tour de France
 2nd Paris–Roubaix
 5th UCI Road World Rankings
1994
 1st Rund um den Henninger Turm
1995
 1st Veenendaal–Veenendaal
1996
 1st Stage 2 Vuelta a Andalucía
 3rd Overall Four Days of Dunkirk
1st Stage 1
 3rd Overall Three Days of De Panne
1st Stage 1
 3rd Omloop Het Volk
 5th E3 Prijs Vlaanderen
 8th Rund um den Henninger Turm

Books 
Olaf Ludwig: Höllenritt auf der Himmelsleiter. Etappen meines Lebens. Herausgegeben von Helmut Wengel. RhinoVerlag, Arnstadt & Weimar 1997,  (german)

References

1960 births
Living people
Sportspeople from Gera
People from Bezirk Gera
East German male cyclists
German male cyclists
Cyclists from Thuringia
German Tour de France stage winners
Tour de France Champs Elysées stage winners
Olympic cyclists of East Germany
Cyclists at the 1980 Summer Olympics
Cyclists at the 1988 Summer Olympics
Cyclists at the 1996 Summer Olympics
Olympic gold medalists for East Germany
Olympic silver medalists for East Germany
Olympic cyclists of Germany
Olympic medalists in cycling
Tour de Suisse stage winners
UCI Road World Champions (elite men)
Medalists at the 1980 Summer Olympics
Medalists at the 1988 Summer Olympics
Recipients of the Patriotic Order of Merit in gold
UCI Road World Cup winners
20th-century German people